Hampden County is a non-governmental county located in the Pioneer Valley of the state of Massachusetts, in the United States.  As of the 2020 census, Hampden County's population was 465,825. Its traditional county seat is Springfield, the Connecticut River Valley's largest city, and economic and cultural capital; with an estimated population of 154,758, approximately 1 in 3 residents of Hampden County live in Springfield. Hampden County was split from Hampshire County in 1812, because Northampton, Massachusetts, was made Hampshire County's "shire town" in 1794; however, Springfield—theretofore Hampshire County's traditional shire town, dating back to its founding in 1636—grew at a pace far quicker than Northampton and was granted shire town-status over its own, southerly jurisdiction. It was named for parliamentarian John Hampden. To the north of Hampden County is modern-day Hampshire County; to the west is Berkshire County; to the east is Worcester County; to the south are Litchfield County, Hartford County, and Tolland County in Connecticut. Hampden County is part of the Springfield, MA Metropolitan Statistical Area. It is the most urban county in Western Massachusetts. The Knowledge Corridor surrounding Springfield-Hartford is New England's second most populous urban area (after Greater Boston) with 1.9 million people.

Law and government
As with most Massachusetts counties, Hampden County exists today only as a historical geographic region, and has no county government. All former county functions were assumed by state agencies in 1998. The sheriff and some other regional officials with specific duties are still elected locally to perform duties within the county region, but there is no county council, county commission or other county governing body. Communities are now granted the right to form their own regional compacts for sharing services. Hampden County and Hampshire County together are part of the Pioneer Valley Planning Commission.

Government and politics

|}

Geography

Adjacent counties
Hampshire County (north)
Worcester County (east)
Tolland County, Connecticut (southeast)
Hartford County, Connecticut (south)
Litchfield County, Connecticut (southwest)
Berkshire County (west)

Communities

Cities
Agawam
Chicopee
Holyoke
Palmer
Springfield (traditional county seat)
West Springfield
Westfield

Towns

Blandford
Brimfield
Chester
East Longmeadow
Granville
Hampden
Holland
Longmeadow
Ludlow
Monson
Montgomery
Russell
Southwick
Tolland
Wales
Wilbraham

Census-designated places
Blandford
Chester
Holland
Monson Center
Russell
Wilbraham

Other unincorporated communities

Bondsville
Depot Village
Feeding Hills
Three Rivers
Woronoco

City neighborhoods
The following are neighborhoods located in Springfield or West Springfield.

Bay
Boston Road
Brightwood
East Forest Park
East Springfield
Forest Park
Indian Orchard
Liberty Heights
McKnight
Memorial Square
Merrick
Metro Center
Old Hill
Pine Point
Six Corners and Maple Heights
Sixteen Acres
South End
Upper Hill

The following are neighborhoods located in Chicopee.

 Aldenville
 Burnett Road
 Chicopee Center (Cabotville)
 Chicopee Falls
 Fairview
 Smith Highlands
 Westover
 Willimansett

The following are neighborhoods located in Holyoke.

 Churchill
 Downtown
 Elmwood
 The Flats
 Highlands
 Highland Park
 Homestead Avenue
 Ingleside
 Jarvis Avenue
 Oakdale
 Rock Valley
 Smith's Ferry
 South Holyoke
 Springdale
 Whiting Farms

National Parks
 Springfield Armory National Historic Site

State parks

 Brimfield State Forest
 Chester-Blandford State Forest
 Chicopee Memorial State Park
 Connecticut River Greenway State Park
 Hampton Ponds State Park
 Holyoke Heritage State Park
 Lake Lorraine State Park (CLOSED)
 Mount Tom State Reservation
 Tolland State Forest

Demographics

2010 census
As of the 2010 United States Census, there were 463,490 people, 179,927 households, and 115,961 families residing in the county. The racial makeup of the county was 76.5% white, 9.0% black or African American, 2.0% Asian, 0.4% American Indian, 0.1% Pacific islander, 9.2% from other races, and 2.9% from two or more races. Those of Hispanic or Latino origin made up 20.9% of the population. The largest ancestry groups were:

 17.9% Puerto Rican
 17.4% Irish
 12.7% French
 11.0% Polish
 10.8% Italian
 8.8% English
 6.0% German
 5.5% French Canadian
 2.6% American
 2.2% Portuguese
 2.0% Scottish
 1.6% Russian
 1.4% West Indian
 1.3% Scotch-Irish
 1.1% Swedish

Of the 179,927 households, 32.6% had children under the age of 18 living with them, 41.9% were married couples living together, 17.5% had a female householder with no husband present, 35.6% were non-families, and 29.2% of all households were made up of individuals. The average household size was 2.49 and the average family size was 3.09. The median age was 38.6 years.

The median income for a household in the county was $47,724 and the median income for a family was $61,061. Males had a median income of $50,207 versus $37,765 for females. The per capita income for the county was $24,718. About 13.2% of families and 17.2% of the population were below the poverty line, including 26.5% of those under age 18 and 11.2% of those age 65 or over.

Demographic breakdown by town

Income

The ranking of unincorporated communities that are included on the list are reflective if the census designated locations and villages were included as cities or towns. Data is from the 2007–2011 American Community Survey 5-Year Estimates.

Education

Colleges and universities

 American International College
 Bay Path University
 Elms College
 Holyoke Community College
 Springfield College
 Springfield Technical Community College
 Western New England University
 Western New England University School of Law
 Westfield State University

Public school districts
 Agawam Public Schools
 Chicopee Public Schools
 East Longmeadow Public Schools
 Gateway Regional School District (Blandford, Chester, Huntington, Middlefield, Montgomery, Russell and Worthington)
 Hampden-Wilbraham Regional School District
 Holyoke Public Schools
 Longmeadow Public Schools
 Monson Public Schools
 Palmer Public Schools
 Southwick-Tolland-Granville Regional School District
 Springfield Public Schools
 Westfield Public Schools
 West Springfield Public Schools

Other institutions
Although no county government exists in Hampden County, a number of private associations, mainly representing trades remain identified with Hampden County. To maintain current training among municipal inspectors, in 2005 the nongovernmental Hampden County Plumbing & Gas Inspectors Association was formed. The Hampden County Bar Association provides support and resources to the legal community and those seeking such representation. In part a legacy of the Eastern States Exposition, the Hampden County Improvement League, and Hampden County Beekeepers Association, both provide agricultural education and outreach. 
The Hampden County Radio Association, an affiliate of the ARRL, offers training in amateur radio and related technology.

Transportation

Major highways

Public transportation
Hampden County is served by both bus and rail service, with intermodal connections at Springfield Union Station, and Holyoke station via the Holyoke Transportation Center. Additionally the region is served by the Westfield-Barnes Regional Airport, and Westover Metropolitan Airport. A bike share program, ValleyBike, connects Springfield, Chicopee, Holyoke and West Springfield to points north in Hampshire County.

Bus
 PVTA
 Peter Pan Bus Lines

Rail
 Hartford Line
 Valley Flyer

See also

 List of Massachusetts locations by per capita income
 National Register of Historic Places listings in Hampden County, Massachusetts
 Registry of Deeds (Massachusetts)
 Tofu Curtain

References

Further reading

External links

 Hampden County District Attorney's Office
 Hampden County Probate Court
 Hampden County Superior Court
 Hampden County Registry of Deeds
 Hampden County Sheriff's Office

 
1812 establishments in Massachusetts
1998 disestablishments in Massachusetts
Massachusetts counties
Populated places disestablished in 1998
Populated places established in 1812
Springfield metropolitan area, Massachusetts